The  was a commonly-worn component of samurai attire during periods such as the Sengoku period (1467–1615) of Japan. A  was a provisions bag used by the samurai class and their retainers. These types of bags were made of twisted paper strings within the style of fine basketwork, and measures around 1  to 9  (around ). These bags were then carried at the right side of the waist.

Another bag, carrying 3 or 4  of uncooked rice, was also considered advisable to carry. Baked rice was also regularly carried in cold weather, due to its emission of heat.

See also

References

Bibliography
The Samurai Sourcebook

External links
 

Textile arts of Japan
Samurai weapons and equipment
Japanese words and phrases